The R622 is a Regional Route in South Africa.

Route
Its western terminus is the R103 at Mooi River. It passes under the N3 and exits the town to the east. It runs east to end at Greytown at an intersection with the R74.

References

Regional Routes in KwaZulu-Natal